Lorne House may refer to:

Lorne House, Castletown, Isle of Man, a registered building of the Isle of Man
Lorne House, Uppingham School, Rutland, England, one of Uppingham School's houses
Lorne House, Box, Wiltshire, England
Lorne Estate, Holywood, Ulster, Northern Ireland